This is a recap of the 2004–05 season of the Professional Bowlers Association (PBA) Tour. It was the tour's 46th season and consisted of 21 events. A major change to the tour this season was the move to an "exempt" format for most standard events. In this format, 58 players (previous season titlists, winners of PBA majors who gained multi-year exemptions, or those finishing high enough on the previous season's points list) automatically qualified for the top 64 each week. The other six spots were filled from a Tour Qualifying Round (TQR) held on the first day of the tournament. 

Patrick Allen won three titles, including a major at the Denny's World Championship, made the top five at all four majors, and captured PBA Player of the Year honors. Danny Wiseman won his first major title and 11th title overall at the Miller High Life ABC Masters. Chris Barnes was victorious at the 62nd U.S. Open, while Steve Jaros won the season-ending Dexter Tournament of Champions.

After the Professional Women's Bowling Association (PWBA) folded in 2003, the PBA opened its membership to women for the first time this season. Missy Bellinder (now Missy Parkin) was the first woman to become a PBA member. Liz Johnson became the first woman to qualify for a PBA Tournament when she made match play at the Uniroyal Tire Classic.  Later in the season at the Banquet Open, she became the first woman to make the TV finals of a PBA event, and the first woman to defeat a man (Wes Malott) in a televised PBA Tour event. Liz was then defeated by Tommy Jones in the championship match, finishing second.

Also during the season, Walter Ray Williams, Jr. became the second bowler in history to reach 40 career PBA titles (joining Earl Anthony), while Parker Bohn III became the fifth bowler to reach 30 career titles.

Tournament schedule

References

External links
2004–05 Season Schedule

Professional Bowlers Association seasons
2004 in bowling
2005 in bowling